Rudnik is a village in Krasnystaw County, Lublin Voivodeship, in eastern Poland. It is the seat of the gmina (administrative district) called Gmina Rudnik.

The village has a population of 543.

References

Rudnik
Lublin Governorate